Peeter Londo (1878 – ?) was an Estonian politician. He was a member of Estonian Constituent Assembly. He was a member of the assembly since 23 April 1919. He replaced Georg Puusepp.

References

1878 births
Members of the Estonian Constituent Assembly
Year of death missing